Michael Wilson (born 15 January 1960) is a former Australian racing cyclist. He rode in nine Grand Tours between 1982 and 1989. He also rode in two events at the 1980 Summer Olympics.

Wilson set the fastest time in the amateur Goulburn to Sydney Classic in 1978 run from Goulburn to Liverpool.

Major results

1978
 1st Overall The Examiner Tour of the North
1980
 1st  (with Jeff Leslie)
1982
 1st Memorial Gastone Nencini
 1st Stage 2 Giro d'Italia
 2nd Giro della Provincia di reggio Calabria
 3rd Gran Piemonte
 7th Overall Ruota d'Oro
1983
 1st Stage 19 Vuelta a España
 3rd GP Montelupo
 6th Giro del Veneto
 9th Giro di Romagna
1984
 1st Trofeo Matteotti
 2nd Giro dell'Emilia
1985
 2nd Trofeo Baracchi (with Daniele Caroli)
 7th Giro di Romagna
 8th Overall Giro d'Italia
1986
 2nd Trofeo Baracchi (with Daniele Caroli)
 3rd Rund um den Henninger Turm
1988
 2nd Tour du Nord-Ouest
 3rd Grand Prix des Nations
 8th Overall Tirreno–Adriatico
 10th Clásica de San Sebastián
1989
 1st Stage 3 Tour de Suisse
 4th Grand Prix des Nations
 5th Overall Tirreno–Adriatico
1st Stage 3
 8th Overall Tour de Romandie
1990
 4th Overall Tour de Romandie
 7th Coppa Sabatini
 7th Grand Prix des Nations
 9th Giro di Romagna
 10th Tour du Nord-Ouest

Grand Tour general classification results timeline

References

External links
 

1960 births
Living people
Australian male cyclists
Olympic cyclists of Australia
Cyclists at the 1980 Summer Olympics
Cyclists from Adelaide
Australian Giro d'Italia stage winners
Australian Vuelta a España stage winners
Tour de Suisse stage winners